Ollie Green is an American producer and production manager. She has won five Primetime Emmy Awards and been nominated for nine more in the categories Outstanding Animated Program and Outstanding Short Form Animated Program for her work on the television programs Robot Chicken and Rick and Morty.

Green's producing credits include The Eric Andre Show, Superjail!, YOLO: Crystal Fantasy, Black Dynamite, Mr. Pickles (and its spin-off Momma Named Me Sheriff), The Simpsons, Hot Streets, Smiling Friends, Fat Guy Stuck in Internet, The Venture Bros., Ballmastrz: 9009 and Lazor Wulf.

References

External links 

Living people
Place of birth missing (living people)
Year of birth missing (living people)
American television producers
Unit production managers
Primetime Emmy Award winners